Maritime UK is the umbrella body and representative body for the UK maritime sector. The UK's maritime sector comprises shipping, ports, marine (leisure, shipbuilding, technology and science) and maritime business services. Maritime contributes around £46.1bn to the UK economy and supports over 1,000,000 jobs.

Maritime UK is registered at Companies House as The Maritime Industries of the United Kingdom.

Members

Baltic Exchange, Belfast Maritime Consortium, British Marine, British Ports Association, CLIA UK & Ireland, Institute of Chartered Shipbrokers, Shipping Innovation, Maritime London, Solent LEP, Maritime UK South West, Mersey Maritime, Nautilus International, Seafarers UK, Society of Maritime Industries, Trinity House, UK Chamber of Shipping, UK Major Ports Group and the Workboat Association.

Leadership

The current Chair is Sarah Kenny OBE, CEO of BMT. The Vice Chair is Robin Mortimer, CEO of the Port of London Authority.

The Director is Ben Murray.

References

External links
 "About Maritime UK"

Trade associations based in the United Kingdom
Organisations based in the London Borough of Southwark
Water transport in the United Kingdom